Free Christians may refer to:

Nondenominational Christianity, autonomous local churches (congregations)
various local movements, notably including:
Free Christians (Britain), individuals and local churches within the General Assembly of Unitarian and Free Christian Churches
churches that are members of the European Liberal Protestant Network

See also
Free church